Cuterebra rufiventris is a species of fly that attack rodents and similar animals. It is found in Brazil and Peru.

References

External links 
 
 Cuterebra rufiventris at insectoid.info

Oestridae
Parasitic flies
Parasites of rodents
Insects described in 1843
Fauna of Brazil
Fauna of Peru
Taxa named by Pierre-Justin-Marie Macquart